Gerzon Armando Chacón (born 25 November 1980 in San Cristóbal) is a Venezuelan football defender who made a total number of 17 appearances (no goals) for the Venezuela national team since 1999. He started his professional career at Deportivo Táchira.

References

External links

 soccernet profile

1980 births
Living people
Venezuelan footballers
Venezuelan expatriate footballers
Venezuela international footballers
Association football defenders
1999 Copa América players
People from San Cristóbal, Táchira
Deportivo Táchira F.C. players
Deportivo Miranda F.C. players
A.C.C.D. Mineros de Guayana players
Sportivo Luqueño players
Aragua FC players
Expatriate footballers in Paraguay
Venezuelan expatriate sportspeople in Paraguay